Nerang railway station is located on the Gold Coast line in Queensland, Australia. It serves the Gold Coast suburb of Nerang.

History
Nerang station opened on 16 December 1997 when the Gold Coast line was extended from Helensvale. It served as the terminus until the line was extended in 1998 to Robina.

Services
Nerang is served by Gold Coast line services from Varsity Lakes to Bowen Hills, Doomben and Brisbane Airport Domestic.

Services by platform

Transport links
Surfside Buslines operate eight routes from Nerang station:
735: to Southport bus station
739: to Griffith University
740: to Surfers Paradise
743: to Broadbeach South Interchange via Pappas Way
744: to Broadbeach South Interchange via Highland Park
745: to Broadbeach South Interchange via Carrara
746: to Yarrimbah Drive
748: to Robina Town Centre
749: to Dugandan Street

References

External links

Nerang station Queensland Rail
Nerang station Queensland's Railways on the Internet

Railway stations in Australia opened in 1997
Railway stations in Gold Coast City